Glipa ohmomoi is a species of beetle in the genus Glipa. It was described in 2000.

References

ohmomoi
Beetles described in 2000